Yadiel Rivera (born May 2, 1992) is a Puerto Rican professional baseball infielder who is currently a free agent. He previously played in Major League Baseball (MLB) for the Milwaukee Brewers, Miami Marlins and Texas Rangers.

Career

Milwaukee Brewers
Rivera was drafted by the Milwaukee Brewers in the ninth round of the 2010 Major League Baseball Draft out of  Manuela Toro High School in Caguas, Puerto Rico. He reached Double-A for the first time in 2014. Rivera was added to the Brewers 40-man roster on November 20, 2014.

Rivera made his Major League debut on September 22, 2015.

On September 4, 2016, Rivera was recalled to the active roster from Class AAA Colorado Springs Sky Sox to back up the injured Jonathan Villar. Rivera was designated for assignment by the Brewers on September 15, 2017. He elected free agency on November 6, 2017.

Miami Marlins
On November 24, 2017, Rivera signed a minor league contract with the Miami Marlins. Rivera's contract was purchased by the Marlins on March 29, 2018, and he was assigned to the Opening Day roster. On July 7, 2018, Rivera hit his first career home run at Nationals Park against Nationals starter Max Scherzer. He was outrighted to AAA on December 10, 2018.

He was assigned to Triple-A New Orleans to start the 2019 season. On August 6, Rivera was designated for assignment. He elected free agency on October 1.

Texas Rangers
On January 10, 2020, Rivera signed a minor league deal with the Texas Rangers that included an invitation to Spring Training. On August 20, 2020, Rivera was selected to the active roster. He made his season debut on August 23. On September 4, Rivera was designated for assignment after going 0 for 5 in 5 at-bats over 4 games. He became a free agent on November 2, 2020.

Houston Astros
On May 8, 2021, Rivera signed a minor league contract with the Houston Astros organization and was assigned to the Triple-A Sugar Land Skeeters. Rivera played in 19 games for the Skeeters, hitting .232/.250/.261 with 8 RBI before he was released on September 16.

Arizona Diamondbacks
On April 1, 2022, Rivera signed a minor league contract with the Arizona Diamondbacks and was assigned to the Triple-A Reno Aces. He was released on June 19, 2022.

References

External links

1992 births
Living people
People from Caguas, Puerto Rico
Major League Baseball players from Puerto Rico
Major League Baseball infielders
Milwaukee Brewers players
Miami Marlins players
Texas Rangers players
Arizona League Brewers players
Helena Brewers players
Wisconsin Timber Rattlers players
Cangrejeros de Santurce (baseball) players
Brevard County Manatees players
Huntsville Stars players
Biloxi Shuckers players
Colorado Springs Sky Sox players
Indios de Mayagüez players
Criollos de Caguas players
New Orleans Baby Cakes players
Sugar Land Skeeters players
Atenienses de Manatí (baseball) players
Liga de Béisbol Profesional Roberto Clemente infielders